Madison Township is one of fourteen townships in Carroll County, Indiana. As of the 2010 census, its population was 433 and it contained 176 housing units.

History
Madison Township was organized in 1837.

Geography

Unincorporated towns
 Ockley
 Radnor

Adjacent townships
 Deer Creek (north)
 Democrat (east)
 Monroe (east)
 Clay (south)
 Washington Township, Tippecanoe County (west)

Major highways
  U.S. Route 421

Cemeteries
The township contains one cemetery, Zion.

References
 United States Census Bureau cartographic boundary files
 U.S. Board on Geographic Names

External links
 Indiana Township Association
 United Township Association of Indiana

Townships in Carroll County, Indiana
Lafayette metropolitan area, Indiana
Townships in Indiana
1837 establishments in Indiana